Vignoles can refer to

 Vignoles rail, kind of railway rail
 Vignoles (grape)
 Vignoles, Côte-d'Or, commune of the Côte-d'Or département, France
 Vignoles (surname)

See also
 Vignole, an island in the Venetian Lagoon, northern Italy